Bathycoccus is a genus of green algae in the order Mamiellales.

References

External links

Chlorophyta genera
Mamiellophyceae